Adamjee Group of Companies is a conglomerate company based primarily in Karachi, Pakistan. The group was headed by Sir Adamjee Haji Dawood. 

As of 2007, it is unofficially estimated that the owners of Adamjee Group are among the top 40 wealthiest families of Pakistan.

History
The company was founded by Haji Dawood in 1896.

The company has had changing fortunes over the past 50 years, initially originating as a jute and banking conglomerate, later spreading to other industries such as tea, textiles, matches, sugar, paper board, chemicals, engineering and insurance.

Subsidiaries 
Enterprises under the umbrella of the group are:
Ad power
Panther Trading (Pvt.) Ltd
Commodities Trading (Pvt.) Ltd
Matual Trading Co. (Pvt) Ltd.
Adamjee Pharmaceuticals Ltd
Coastal Enterprises (Pvt.) Ltd
Adamjee Diesel Engineering (Pakistan) Ltd
Pacific Multi Products (Pvt) Ltd
Adamjee Engineering (Pvt) Ltd
Chempro Pakistan Ltd
Enesel Industries (Pvt) Ltd
Sahara Buying Services
Adamjee Automotive Ltd
Adamjee Polymers Company (Pvt) Ltd
Adamjee Durabuilt Ltd
Adamjee Corporation
Former enterprises which were based in East Pakistan are:

 Jute
 Adamjee Jute Mills
 Jute Fibers Ltd.
 R. Sim & Co. (operated jute presses)
 Sugar
 Adamjee Sugar Mills
 National Sugar Mills
 Textile
 Orient Textile Mills
 Meghna Textile Mills
 Khulna Textile Mills
Adamjee Cotton Mills
 Bangladesh Textile Mills (now a state-owned enterprise run by the Government of Bangladesh)
 Tea
 National Tea
 Aroma Tea
 Patrakola Tea Company
 Adamjee Tea Gardens

 Cement
 Assam Bengal Cement Company
 Steamship 
 Bengal Assam Steamship Company
 Chittagong Steamship Company
 Insurance
 Premier Insurance Company
 Other
 Dhaka Vegetable Oil Mills
 National Tubes (produced galvanized iron pipes and fittings)
 Dacca Tobacco Industries (now owned by Akij Group)
 Gammon East Pakistan Ltd. (a civil engineering and construction firm)
 Premier Laminations (a company that produced polyethylene bags)
 Star Particle Board Mills (now owned by Partex Group)
 Adamjee Sons Ltd. (A holding company which owned the shares of the group's subsidiaries along with properties, tea gardens, and stock in other corporations on behalf of the Adamjee family. It was nationalized by the Government of Bangladesh in 1971 and continues to be run as a state-owned enterprise today.)

Other former enterprises:

 Adamjee Insurance (acquired by Nishat Group in 2004)
 Muslim Commercial Bank (nationalized in 1972 under Zulfikar Ali Bhutto, reprivatised to Nishat Group )
 Orient Airways (became PIA in 1955)
 Adamjee Industries (a textile manufacturing company in Pakistan which now operates as al-Karam Textile Mills)

See also 
List of largest companies in Pakistan

References

External links 
 Adamjee Group

Conglomerate companies of Pakistan
Conglomerate companies established in 1947
Companies based in Karachi
Pakistani companies established in 1947